Frank Lascelles may refer to:

Frank Lascelles (diplomat) (1841–1920), British diplomat
Frank Lascelles (pageant master) (1875–1934), British pageant master